The Fwa is a river in the Democratic Republic of the Congo in central Africa, flowing through Kasai-Oriental province. The river is a tributary of the Lubi River, which is a tributary to the Sankuru River, in the southeastern Congo River drainage basin.

Fauna 

The river is particularly notable for its diverse community of fish. This community includes five endemic cichlid species: Cyclopharynx fwae, C. schwetzi, Schwetzochromis neodon, Thoracochromis brauschi and T. callichromus.

References 

 FishBase (2006) Eds. Froese, R. and D. Pauly. World Wide Web electronic publication. fishbase.org version (07/2006).

Rivers of the Democratic Republic of the Congo